Patsy O'Hara (Irish: Peatsaí Ó hEadhra; 11 July 1957 – 21 May 1981) was an Irish republican hunger striker and member of the Irish National Liberation Army (INLA).

Biography
O'Hara was born in Bishop Street, Derry, Northern Ireland. He joined Na Fianna Éireann in 1970, and in 1971, one of his brothers Sean was interned in Long Kesh. In late 1971, at the age of 14, he was shot and wounded by a soldier while manning a barricade. Due to his injuries, he was unable to attend the civil rights march on Bloody Sunday but watched it go by him in the Brandywell, and the events of the day had a lasting effect on him.

In October 1974, O'Hara was interned in Long Kesh, and on his release in April 1975 he joined the Irish Republican Socialist Party (IRSP) and INLA. He was arrested in Derry in June 1975 and held on remand for six months. In September 1976, he was arrested again and once more held on remand for four months.

On 10 May 1978, he was arrested on O'Connell Street, Dublin, Republic of Ireland under section 30 of the Offences Against the State Act, and was released 18 hours later. He returned to Derry in January 1979 and was active in the INLA. On 14 May 1979, he was arrested and was convicted of possessing a hand grenade. He was sentenced to eight years in prison in January 1980.

He became Officer Commanding of the INLA prisoners at the beginning of the first hunger strike in 1980, and he joined the 1981 strike on 22 March.

On Thursday, 21 May, at 11:29 pm, he died after 61 days on hunger strike, at the age of 23. In accordance with his wishes, his parents did not get him the medical intervention needed to save his life. His corpse was found to be mysteriously disfigured prior to its departure from prison and before the funeral, including signs of his face being beaten, a broken nose, and cigarette burns on his body.

Family
His mother Peggy O'Hara, was an independent candidate in the 2007 Northern Ireland Assembly election in the Foyle constituency. She was not elected, but she was one of the more successful dissident republican candidates opposed to the new policy of the Sinn Féin leadership of working with the Police Service of Northern Ireland (PSNI), and won 1,789 votes. On the eve of the election, over 330 former republican prisoners wrote a letter to the Derry Journal endorsing her campaign.

References

External links
 
 Biography from the Irish Republican Socialist Movement
 Stailc 81 Hunger Strike Commemoration Committee

1957 births
1981 deaths
Irish National Liberation Army members
Irish people who died in prison custody
People of The Troubles (Northern Ireland) from Derry (city)
Irish republicans interned without trial
Irish Republican Socialist Party politicians
People who died on the 1981 Irish hunger strike